The Zirc Arboretum is an arboretum in Zirc, Hungary.

The existence of their collection of plants is associated with the arrival of the Cistercian order to Zirc.

In the Forestry House in Bakonybél is an exhibition about the arboretum, environmental protection and forestry.

References

External links 
 Arborétum - Zirc
 The Zirc Arboretum (Hungarian)

Environment of Hungary
Arboreta
Geography of Veszprém County
Tourist attractions in Veszprém County